Lawrence Bishnoi (born 12 February 1993) is an Indian gangster from Punjab, India. He has two dozen criminal cases against him including ones for murder and extortion. He has denied these allegations. His gang is affiliated with over 700 shooters across the country. He is in custody in Tihar Jail.

Early life 
Lawrence Bishnoi was born on 12 February 1993 in a village in Abohar, Ferozpur, Punjab. His father was a police constable for the Haryana Police. He left the police force in 1997 and became a farmer. Lawrence studied in Abohar until the 12th grade in 2010 when he moved to Chandigarh to DAV College. He joined the Panjab University Campus Students Council in 2011, where he met Goldy Brar (real name Satinder Singh), another gangster. They became involved in university politics and began committing crimes. He completed his LLB from Panjab University.

Criminal activity 

Bishnoi began his criminal activities in Chandigarh when several first information reports (FIRs) were registered against him for crimes including an attempt to murder, trespassing, assault and robbery between 2010 and 2012. All of these cases were related to his involvement in student politics. Out of the seven FIRs registered against him in Chandigarh, he was acquitted in four and three cases are still pending. During his time in jail, Bishnoi built alliances with criminals behind bars. After being released, he met with arms dealers and other local criminals. His gang increased in size throughout his education in Panjab University.

After graduation in 2013, he allegedly gunned down the winning candidate of elections of the Government College in Muktsar and a rival candidate at the Ludhiana Municipal Corporation elections. Bishnoi had to often go into hiding. After 2013 he ventured into liquor dealing. He also sheltered murderers in his gang. In 2014 he had an armed encounter with the Rajasthan Police after which he was sent to jail where he plotted murders and witness executions.

He befriended a gangster-turned-politician, Jaswinder Singh, alias Rocky. Under Rocky, he remained active in Bharatpur, Rajasthan. Rocky was assassinated in 2016 by Jaipal Bhullar, who himself was gunned down in 2020.

In 2018, a close associate of Bishnoi, Sampath Nehra, who allegedly carried out recce of Salman Khan's residence, disclosed that he was tasked with assassinating Salman Khan for his involvement in the Black Buck hunting case. According to the police, the Bishnoi community considers the Black Buck species to be sacred.

While being transported by police to appear in a Jodhpur court in Rajasthan for a case of extortion, Bishnoi stated that "Salman Khan will be killed here, in Jodhpur... Then he will come to know about our real identity... Now, if police want me to do some major crime, I shall kill Salman Khan and that too in Jodhpur." He claimed that he had been framed for fake charges.

He continued to operate his syndicate while in Bharatpur jail, allegedly by receiving help from jail staff. In 2021, he was transferred to Tihar Jail in Delhi regarding a case registered under the MCOCA. According to authorities, Bishnoi uses Voice over IP calls to communicate with his associates outside the jail.

On 29 May 2022, Punjabi singer Sidhu Moose Wala was shot dead in Mansa, Punjab. Hours after the assassination, responsibility for the shooting was claimed by Goldy Brar, who claimed that he had engineered the plot with Bishnoi. Police suggested that Bishnoi's gang was involved in the shooting. At the time of the shooting, he was in Tihar Jail. Delhi Police Special Cell obtained a 5 day custody of Lawrence for investigation.

Soon after Moose Wala's assassination, Bishnoi moved a plea in the Delhi High Court stating that he was afraid for his life and feared a fake encounter by the Punjab police. He said that the Delhi Police and the Tihar Jail authority must ensure his safety and that he must be properly handcuffed and shackled. He later withdrew that plea from the Delhi HC. He later moved his petition in the Punjab and Haryana High Court.

The Bishnoi gang is allegedly working with 700 shooters across 5 states in India with a reach outside India as well.

References 

Indian criminals
Indian gangsters
1993 births
Living people
Punjabi people